Red Creek is a stream in Iron County, Utah. Its mouth lies at an elevation of  near Paragonah, Utah. Its source is located at an elevation of 9,560 feet at  near Willow Spring in the Markagunt Plateau.

History
Red Creek was originally known by the early travelers on the Mormon Road as the 2nd Creek in the Little Salt Lake Valley, now known as the Parowan Valley, as one traveled southward in the valley. It was a camping spot on the road described in the 1851 Mormon Waybill as having: "...good feed, and wood."

See also
List of rivers of Utah

References

Rivers of Utah
Rivers of Iron County, Utah
Mormon Road